Barnadesia aculeata is a species of flowering plant in the family Asteraceae. It is endemic to Ecuador, where it occurs in the central Andes. It grows in mountain shrubland above 2000 meters in elevation. It is vulnerable to habitat destruction.

References

Barnadesioideae
Endemic flora of Ecuador
Vulnerable plants
Taxonomy articles created by Polbot